Sree Vishnu (born Rudraraju Vishnuvardhan; 29 February 1984) is an Indian actor who works in Telugu films. After appearing in minor roles, Vishnu got his breakthrough with Prema Ishq Kaadhal (2013). He later starred in films such as Second Hand (2013), Appatlo Okadundevadu (2016), Vunnadhi Okate Zindagi (2017), Mental Madhilo (2017), Brochevarevarura (2019), and Raja Raja Chora (2021). In 2018, he was nominated for SIIMA Award for Best  Supporting Actor for the film Vunnadhi Okate Zindagi (2017).

Early life 
Sree Vishnu was born in Antarvedipalem of East Godavari district, Andhra Pradesh. He graduated in Bachelor of Business Management (Honors) from Gandhi Institute of Technology and Management, Visakhapatnam. He worked as a web designer in Hyderabad till 2006, after which he quit to pursue a career in the film industry and started as an assistant director. 

While in college he was a member of the theatre group. He also played for the under-19 Andhra cricket team. Vishnu is a friend of fellow actor Nara Rohit and has collaborated with him in several films.

Career 
Vishnu acted in several short films. One of them, "Bewarse" directed by Pavan Sadineni, became popular on YouTube. His first film roles were minor ones in Baanam and Solo. In 2013, he was approached by Pavan Sadineni, for a lead role in the film Prema Ishq Kaadhal. In 2014, he acted in Nara Rohit's Prathinidhi as a home minister's son. In a review of Second Hand (2013) by The Times of India, the reviewer wrote that "Vishnu sparkles with his dialogue delivery".

Following a few other minor roles, in 2016 he had a lead role in the film Appatlo Okadundevadu.

Filmography 

All films are in Telugu, unless otherwise noted.

References

External links 

Indian male film actors
Living people
1984 births
Male actors from Andhra Pradesh
People from East Godavari district
Telugu male actors
Male actors in Telugu cinema